Janesville Township is a township in Waseca County, Minnesota, United States. The population was 520 at the 2000 census.

History
Janesville Township was organized in 1858, and named after its main settlement, Janesville.  The township contains one property listed on the National Register of Historic Places, the Seha Sorghum Mill, established circa 1904.

Geography

Demographics
As of the census of 2000, there were 520 people, 190 households, and 149 families residing in the township. The population density was 16.8 people per square mile (6.5/km2). There were 200 housing units at an average density of 6.5/sq mi (2.5/km2). The racial makeup of the township was 99.42% White, 0.19% Native American and 0.38% Asian.

There were 190 households, out of which 34.7% had children under the age of 18 living with them, 68.9% were married couples living together, 3.7% had a female householder with no husband present, and 21.1% were non-families. 18.9% of all households were made up of individuals, and 6.3% had someone living alone who was 65 years of age or older. The average household size was 2.74 and the average family size was 3.15.

In the township the population was spread out, with 26.0% under the age of 18, 11.3% from 18 to 24, 23.7% from 25 to 44, 28.3% from 45 to 64, and 10.8% who were 65 years of age or older. The median age was 39 years. For every 100 females, there were 113.1 males. For every 100 females age 18 and over, there were 113.9 males.

The median income for a household in the township was $45,667, and the median income for a family was $46,923. Males had a median income of $31,111 versus $25,500 for females. The per capita income for the township was $17,714. About 5.5% of families and 5.6% of the population were below the poverty line, including 10.1% of those under age 18 and none of those age 65 or over.

References

Townships in Waseca County, Minnesota
Townships in Minnesota